Mexico has had a Jewish population since the early Colonial Era. However, these early individuals could not openly worship as they were persecuted by the Spanish Inquisition for practicing Judaism. After achieving independence, Mexico eventually adopted freedom of religion and began receiving Jewish immigrants, many of them refugees. The book Estudio histórico de la migración judía a México 1900-1950 has records of almost 18,300 who emigrated to Mexico between 1900 and 1950. Most (7,023) were Ashkenazi Jews whose ancestors had settled in Eastern Europe, mainly Poland. A further 2,640 Jews arrived from either Spain or the Ottoman Empire and 1,619 came from Cuba and the United States.

The 2010 Census recorded 67,476 individuals professing Judaism, most of whom live in Mexico City.

The following is a list of notable past and present Mexican Jews (not all with both parents Jewish, nor all practising Judaism), arranged by their main field of activity:
Jose Luis Seligson Visual Artist

Academia
 Adina Cemet, Ph.D., sociologist, author, essayist.
 Julio Frenk, president of the University of Miami, former Secretary of Health and dean of the Harvard School of Public Health
 Enrique Krauze, public intellectual, historian, essayist, critic, producer, and publisher
 Helen Kleinbort Krauze, historian, mother of Enrique Krauze
 Arturo Warman, anthropologist, cabinet member of Salinas and Zedillo

Architecture
 Sara Topelson de Grinberg, architect 
 Abraham Zabludovsky, architect
 Alejandro Zohn, architect, Holocaust survivor

Arts

Classical music
 Daniel Catán, composer
 Max Lifchitz, composer
 Henryk Szeryng, violinist

Photography
 Senya Fleshin, photographer and anarchist 
 Mariana Yampolsky, photographer

Visual arts
 Maurice Ascalon, sculptor
 Arnold Belkin, painter, born in Canada
 Olga Costa, painter
 Luis Filcer, Expressionist painter
 Pedro Friedeberg, painter
 Mathias Goeritz, painter, sculptor, born in Germany
 Vlady Kibalchich Russakov, painter
 Tosia Malamud, sculptor
 Leonardo Nierman, painter, sculptor 
 Wolfgang Paalen, painter, sculptor and art philosopher
 Fanny Rabel, painter, member of Los Fridos artistic group.
 Diego Rivera, painter, muralist (Atheist)
 José Sacal, sculptor

Business
 Carlos Alazraki, advertising executive 
 Daniel Lubetzky, entrepreneur, author
 Franz Mayer, financier, photographer, collector, and the founder of the Franz Mayer Museum
 Moisés Saba, businessman; board member of various companies 
 Sergio Zyman, marketing executive

Entertainment

Film and television
 Brigitte Alexander, actress, director, author and translator for UNESCO
 Susana Alexander, actress
 Erick Elias, actor
 Irán Eory, actress, model
 Gabriela Goldsmith, actress
 Israel Jaitovich, host and comedian
 Pati Jinich, TV chef, cookbook author
 Brontis Jodorowsky, actor
 Mauricio Kleiff, screenwriter
 María Eugenia Llamas, actress
 Mariana Levy, actress
 Emmanuel Lubezki, cinematographer, winner of three Ariel Awards for Best Cinematography (1992, 1993, 1994) and 3 Oscars in the category (2013–15)
 Miroslava, actress 
 Norma Mora, actress
 David Ostrosky, actor
 Alfredo Ripstein, film producer 
 Arturo Ripstein, filmmaker, screenwriter, producer
 Claudia Salinas, model, actress 
 Alexander Salkind, producer.
 Ilya Salkind, producer.
 Diego Schoening, singer, actor and television host
 Alan Tacher, television host
 Ari Telch, actor 
 Gregorio Walerstein, film producer and screenwriter

Music
 Alix Bauer, singer, founding member of Timbiriche
 Ari Borovoy, songwriter, founding member of the Latin pop group OV7
 Adan Jodorowsky, musician, singer, and actor
 Mark Tacher, musician, vocalist, guitarist, and television host
 Ariel Pink, musician, indie rocker, progenitor of the hypnagogic pop genre

Journalism
 Shanik Berman, journalist 
 David Faitelson, sports journalist 
 Giselle Fernández, television journalist 
 Adela Micha, TV and radio journalist
 Jacobo Zabludovsky Kraveski, TV journalist

Literature
 Chloe Aridjis, novelist
 Sabina Berman, author, playwright, screenwriter
 Anita Brenner, writer, historian
 Mariana Frenk-Westheim, prose writer, Hispanist, translator
 Margo Glantz, writer and critic* a prose writer who was author of the New York Times bestseller The Empress.
 Bárbara Jacobs, author, poet, essayist, translator
 Myriam Moscona, author, journalist, poet and Ladino translator
 Moises Salinas author and psychologist
 Sara Sefchovich, writer
 Esther Seligson, writer, poet, translator, and historian
 Ilan Stavans, literary critic

Science

Biology
 Jerzy Rzedowski, botanist, plant geographer, researcher, Holocaust survivor

Engineering
 Edward Esseis, nuclear engineer

Mathematics
 Samuel Gitler Hammer, mathematician

Medicine
 George Rosenkranz, pioneering scientist in the field of steroid chemistry; Contract bridge Grand Life Master
 Pablo Rudomín Zevnovaty, neuroscientist
 Nora Volkow, psychiatrist; current director of the United States' National Institute on Drug Abuse

Physics
 Jacob Bekenstein, physicist
 Deborah Berebichez, physicist
 Gloria Koenigsberger, physicist
 Marcos Moshinsky, awarded physicist, UNAM cathedratic, Ukrainian-born

Politics
 Gabriela Brimmer, writer and activist for persons with disabilities
 Luis de Carabajal y Cueva, adventurer, slave-trader, Governor of Nuevo León 
 Francisca Nuñez de Carabajal, Marrana, sister of Luis de Carabajal, executed along with family members for practicing Judaism
 Luis de Carabajal the younger, Governor of Nuevo León, author 
 Francisco de Carvajal, founder of the New Kingdom of León.
 David Goldbaum, surveyor and politician of Baja California 
 Jorge Castañeda Gutman, politician and academic who served as Secretary of Foreign Affairs; also known for losing a Supreme Court ruling that would have allowed him to run as an Independent in the 2006 Presidential race
 Vicente Lombardo Toledano, labor leader
 Diego de Montemayor, founder of Monterrey
 Juan de Oñate, Governor of Santa Fe de Nuevo México, descendant of Conversos
 Adela Cojab, Israel activist, author
 Andrés Roemer, diplomat, author
 Eliezer Ronen, Israeli politician 
Claudia Sheinbaum, Mayor of Mexico City
 Binyamin Temkin, Israeli politician 
 José Woldenberg, political scientist and sociologist

Religion
 Jacob Avigdor, Chief Rabbi of the Ashkenazi Jewish community, author, Holocaust survivor
 Yosef Dayan, rabbi and the author of several books in Hebrew, Spanish and Italian
 Moisés Kaiman, rabbi from Monterrey

Sports
 Ilana Berger, tennis player 
 Wolf Ruvinskis, wrestler

See also
 List of Latin American Jews
 List of Mexicans
 List of Jews

References

External links
 Judíos Destacados en México, articles on notable Mexican Jews by Diario Judio

Mexico
 
Jews
Jews,Mexican